Oxysterol-binding protein 2 is a protein that in humans is encoded by the OSBP2 gene.

Oxysterols are byproducts of cholesterol that can have cytotoxic effects on many cell types. The protein encoded by this gene contains a pleckstrin homology (PH) domain and an oxysterol-binding region. It binds oxysterols such as 7-ketocholesterol and may inhibit their cytotoxicity. Alternate transcriptional splice variants have been observed but have not been fully characterized.

References

Further reading